Eva Olofsson (born 1952) is a Swedish Left Party politician. She was a member of the Riksdag 2006–2014 and Councillor of the Västra Götaland Regional Council in 2014–2021.

External links
Eva Olofsson at the Riksdag website

Members of the Riksdag from the Left Party (Sweden)
Living people
1952 births
Women members of the Riksdag
21st-century Swedish women politicians